Njav is a Malakula language of Vanuatu. There are about 10 speakers.

References

Sources

Further reading

Malekula languages
Languages of Vanuatu